Eda is a Japanese surname that may refer to:

 Katsuya Eda, mathematician specializing in set theory and algebraic topology
 Kenji Eda, independent Japanese politician
 Ryoko Eda, Japanese marathon runner
 Satsuki Eda, president of the house of councillors in Japan
, Japanese rower
 Yasuyuki Eda, Japanese politician in the New Komeito Party

Japanese-language surnames